Sunset Song is a 1932 novel by Scottish writer Lewis Grassic Gibbon. It is considered one of the most important Scottish novels of the 20th century. It is the first part of the trilogy A Scots Quair.

There have been several adaptations, including a 1971 television series by BBC Scotland, a 2015 film version, and some stage versions.

Plot introduction
The central character is a young woman, Chris Guthrie, growing up in a farming family in the fictional parish of Kinraddie in the Mearns at the start of the 20th century. Life is hard, and her family is dysfunctional.

Plot summary
Chris Guthrie's mother, broken by repeated childbirths and learning she is again pregnant, kills her baby twins and herself. Two younger children go to live with their aunt and uncle in Aberdeen, leaving Chris, her older brother Will, and her father to run the farm on their own. Will and his father have a stormy relationship; and Will emigrates to Argentina with his young bride, Mollie Douglas. Chris is left to do all the work around the house. Soon after this, her father suffers a stroke, leaving him bedridden. For a time, he tries to persuade her to commit incest with him; but, as he is badly hurt, he is not able to force her. He dies shortly afterwards. At his funeral, Chris realises what happened to her father and breaks down in tears as she never knew the hardship he has endured for them.

Chris, who has had some education, considers leaving for a job as a teacher in the towns, but realises she loves the land and cannot leave it. Instead, she marries a young farmer called Ewan Tavendale and carries on farming. For a time, they are happily married, and they have a son, whom they also call Ewan. However, when World War I breaks out, Ewan Sr. and many other young men join up. When he comes home on leave, he treats Chris badly, evidently brutalised by his experiences in the army. Ewan dies in the war; and Chris subsequently hears from Chae Strachan, who is home on leave, that Ewan was shot as a deserter but that he died thinking of her. She begins a relationship with the new minister, and she watches as he dedicates the War Memorial at the Standing Stones above her home. The Sun sets to the Flowers of the Forest, bringing an end to their way of life, forever.

Map of Kinraddie with the main characters

Major themes
The novel touches on several issues; the distinctive, not always positive character, of small rural communities in the North East of Scotland, the role of women, and the "peasant crisis" i.e. the coming of modernisation to traditional farming communities.  The theme of the onset of modernisation and the end of old ways is explored using many symbols, for example, violent deaths of horses (supposed to represent old, traditional farming methods) and the appearance of motorised cars representing new technologies which brush the people of the land from the road. The author also has some political opinions reflected in the characters of Chae Strachan, the Socialist, and Long Rob, the pacifist, and he shows how they react to the coming of the war. The dilemma Chris faces over whether to continue her education or commit to a life in the land is also featured. The title of the novel is a direct reference to the theme of the sunset of the old ways and traditions. By some readings Chris is "Chris Caledonia", an allegorical figure for Scotland itself.

Literary significance and criticism
When it was first published, some readers were shocked by its realistic treatment of sex and childbirth, and its sometimes negative portrayals of family life. Some wondered if it had been written by a woman using a male pseudonym.

The novel is written in an essentially artificial form of Scots intended to capture the colloquial speech of The Mearns peasants without being inaccessible to English speakers.

Film, TV and theatrical adaptations
In 1971 it was adapted for television as Sunset Song.

There are also a number of adaptations for the stage. One of the best known is by Alastair Cording.

Jack Webster, the Scottish writer and journalist, wrote a play based on the novel and Lewis Grassic Gibbon's life which toured Scotland in 2008. The novel was also the inspiration for the Richard Thompson song "Poor Ditching Boy" on his 1972 album Henry the Human Fly.

In 2015, English filmmaker Terence Davies and producer Bob Last released an adaptation of the book, titled Sunset Song, starring Agyness Deyn and Peter Mullan.

References

External links
1971 BBC Scotland miniseries version of 
 Guide to a stage version of the novel
 https://web.archive.org/web/20080920015227/http://www.theherald.co.uk/features/features/display.var.2438257.0.A_Song_that_wont_remain_the_same.php Review of Cording's stage version]

1932 British novels
1932 in Scotland
British novels adapted into films
Novels by Lewis Grassic Gibbon
Novels set in Aberdeenshire
Scots-language works
Jarrold Publishing books
The Century Company books